Ścinawa Nyska  is a village in the administrative district of Gmina Korfantów, within Nysa County, Opole Voivodeship, in south-western Poland. 

The village has a population of 630.

References

Villages in Nysa County